Afternoon in Paris is an album by American pianist and composer John Lewis and French guitarist Sacha Distel recorded for the Atlantic label.

Reception

Allmusic reviewer, Alex Henderson stated: "the part-American, part-French group of improvisers provides an above-average bop album".

Track listing
 "I Cover the Waterfront" (Johnny Green, Edward Heyman) - 6:51
 "Dear Old Stockholm" (Traditional) - 6:07
 "Afternoon in Paris" (John Lewis) - 9:23
 "All the Things You Are" (Jerome Kern, Oscar Hammerstein II) - 5:16
 "Bags' Groove" (Milt Jackson) - 6:12
 "Willow Weep for Me" (Ann Ronell) - 9:31

Personnel 
John Lewis - piano
Sacha Distel - guitar
Barney Wilen - tenor saxophone
Percy Heath (tracks 4-6), Pierre Michelot (tracks 1-3) - bass 
Kenny Clarke (tracks 4-6), Connie Kay (tracks 1-3) - drums

References 

1957 albums
John Lewis (pianist) albums
Sacha Distel albums
Atlantic Records albums